Cristești is a village in Nisporeni District, Moldova.

References

Villages of Nisporeni District